The 2014 Duquesne Dukes football team represented Duquesne University as a member of the Northeast Conference (NEC) during the 2014 NCAA Division I FCS football season. Led by tenth-year head coach Jerry Schmitt, the Dukes compiled an overall record of 6–6 with a mark of 2–4 in conference play, placing fifth in the NEC. Duquesne played home games at Arthur J. Rooney Athletic Field in Pittsburgh.

Schedule

References

Duquesne
Duquesne Dukes football seasons
Duquesne Dukes football